Lozova is a main hub and a railway junction in East Ukraine.  It is the second busiest railway station in Kharkiv Oblast after Kharkiv Railway Station. It is located 156.3 km south of Russia and is a subsidy of Southern Railways an administrative branch of Ukrainian Railways.

Building
In 1869 the railway line was opened between Kursk and Azov Sea. The place where the modern building structure is located was named Lozova. Shortly after building a small station it was decided to make it a dividing line railway station.

History

References

External links
Railway Traffic Time Table at Lozova Railway Station
Lozova Railway Traffic within the Oblast
Lozova Railway Station information on Ukraine Railways Website 
Aerial View of the Railway Station
Official site of Ukrainian Railways 

Railway stations in Kharkiv Oblast
Railway stations opened in 1869
Southern Railways (Ukraine) stations